Bethany Allen (born October 6, 1982) is an American professional racing cyclist who rides for Inpa–Bianchi.

See also
 List of 2016 UCI Women's Teams and riders

References

External links
 

1982 births
Living people
American female cyclists
Place of birth missing (living people)
21st-century American women